Jenson Alexander Lyons Button  (born 19 January 1980) is a British racing driver. He won the 2009 Formula One World Championship when he drove for the Brawn GP team. After his F1 career, he became champion of the 2018 season of the Super GT Series alongside Naoki Yamamoto, with whom he shared a Honda racing car at Team Kunimitsu. He currently competes part-time in the NASCAR Cup Series, driving the No. 15 Ford Mustang for Rick Ware Racing with support from Stewart-Haas Racing and sponsorship from Mobil 1.

Button began karting at the age of eight and achieved early success, before progressing to car racing in the British Formula Ford Championship and the British Formula 3 Championship. He first drove in F1 with Williams for the 2000 season. The following year he switched to Benetton, which at the start of the 2002 season became the Renault team, and then for the 2003 season he moved to BAR. He finished third in the 2004 World Drivers' Championship, before falling to ninth in the 2005 championship.

Following the withdrawal of Honda from the sport in December 2008, Button was left without a team for the 2009 season. In February 2009, Ross Brawn led a management buyout of Honda, creating Brawn GP and recruiting Button as a driver.

At the start of the 2010 season, he moved to McLaren, partnering fellow British racer Lewis Hamilton. After finishing fifth for the team in 2010, Button ended the 2011 season as runner-up, before falling to fifth in the 2012 championship. From the 306 races that Button started, he won 15, qualified on pole position 8 times, took 50 podium finishes and scored 1,235 championship points.

Early life and education
Button was born on 19 January 1980 in Frome, Somerset and brought up in nearby Vobster, Mells. He is the fourth child of the half-South African Simone Lyons and former rallycross driver John Button from London's East End, who was well known in the United Kingdom during most of the 1970s for racing his Volkswagen Type 1, which was nicknamed the Colorado Beetle. Jenson's parents met in Newquay at a young age and were reunited after a musical concert at Longleat. According to John, Jenson was named after his Danish friend and rallycross opponent Erling Jensen, changing the "e" to an "o" to differentiate it from Jensen Motors, while Simone recalls that she named him Jenson after noticing a Jensen sports car and thought the change of spelling would be "more mannish".

Button enjoyed racing from an early age, racing a BMX bike with friends after school, and began watching Formula One (F1) motor racing with his father around the age of five or six. He idolised four-time world champion Alain Prost for his calm personality and intellectual approach to driving. After his parents divorced when he was seven, he and his three elder sisters were brought up by their mother in Frome. Button was educated at Vallis First School, Selwood Middle School and Frome Community College. His karting career limited his studying and he left school with one GCSE. Button failed his first driving test for driving between two cars on a narrow road.

Karting career 
Button's father gave him a 50cc bike for his seventh birthday; he discarded it after half an hour because it lacked speed, which would have required his father to remove its restrictor, and he disliked his father's idea of progressing to the 80cc category. John talked to rallycross driver and Ripspeed car accessories owner Keith Ripp at an Earl's Court racing car show about his son; Kipp recommended the purchase of a Zip go-kart suited for the newly formed Cadets class for eight to twelve year-old karters for the young boy. Button received the kart as a Christmas present in 1987 and he began karting at the Clay Pigeon Raceway in May 1988 aged eight following repeated questions by club members to his father on when Button would start racing.

He was required to drive on slick tyres on a wet track because his father wanted him to learn car control on a sodden surface and taught him basic driving techniques by standing at a corner and pointing to where his son should brake. In 1989, aged nine, Button won the British Super Prix. Midway through the year, his father spoke to him about progressing to the club level since others noticed he was competitive, which Button was interested in. He won all 34 races of the 1991 British Cadet Kart Championship and the title with team Wright Karts. Afterwards Button told his father his objective was to compete in F1 and he was given a map to chart his progress in karting. The two agreed to give each other more autonomy and Button was mentored by mechanic Dave Spencer in moving from the Cadets to Juniors class. Spencer told him to be more aggressive and less smooth driving Junior karts because they have more power than a Cadet kart. Button was also required to manage the condition of his tyres to retain grip.

Further successes followed, including three British Open Kart Championship wins. A series of sub-par performances in 1992 gave Button doubts over his ability to win races and he told his father he wanted to continue racing after dismissing the suggestion of two months away from karting. The family telephoned Spencer for advice; he and Button's father constructed the young boy's karts and influenced his school headteacher to change his fitness regime and had to eschew unhealthy beverages. Spencer helped him to observe and concentrate on how others drove their karts, and continued to coach Button until his youngest son Danny died in a multi-kart accident at the Hunts Kart Racing Club in Kimbolton, Cambridgeshire in December 1994.

Button was fourth in the 1994 RAC British Junior Championship after losing the opportunity to claim the title through a series of accidents. He joined the Birel team for that year's Junior Intercontinental A European Championship and raced as a professional in the Junior Intercontinental A Italian Winter Championship. He was the youngest runner-up of the Formula A World Championship at age 15. Button was signed to drive Tecno-Rotax karts for Team GKS, coming fifth in the 1996 European Formula A Championship, third in the Formula A World Cup, and third in the American Championship. In 1997, he was moved to the top-level of karting Formula Super A by his team. Button won the Ayrton Senna Memorial Cup for finishing second in the 1997 Japanese World Cup, and became the youngest driver and first Briton to claim the European Super A Championship. He also was runner-up in the Winter Cup before the European Super A Championship.

Junior car career 
Aged 18, Button moved into single seater car racing after his mentor Paul Lemmens spoke to racing manager and former driver Harald Huysman about him. He was signed to businessman David Robertson and Huysman's managerial stable, who found him sponsorship to continue driving. Robertson wanted Button to test a Carlin Motorsport Dallara F3 Mugen-Honda car at the Pembrey Circuit and quickly became acclimated with a more powerful vehicle and extra downforce. Huysman and Robertson wanted Button to enter Formula Three (F3) but Button said he could not do so with his inexperience in car racing and did not want to enter the category for fear of immediately being uncompetitive. Button instead moved to Formula Ford for the 1998 season. He took the British Formula Ford Championship in a Haywood Racing Mygale SJ98 car with nine victories and won the season-ending Formula Ford Festival at Brands Hatch. Button also finished runner-up in the European Formula Ford Championship with one victory from four races.

At the end of 1998, Button won the annual Autosport BRDC Award, which included a test in a McLaren MP4/14 F1 car that he received in November 1999. Huysman and Robertson sought a seat for him in F3 and spoke to Promatecme team owner Serge Saulnier, who did not want to sign Button because he was not part of Renault's driver academy. Additional lobbying from Mygale and Lemmens convinced Sauliner to give Button a test at the Circuit de Nevers Magny-Cours in France. He impressed Saulnier and accepted his offer to drive at Promatecme. Salunier taught Button on the downforce of F3 cars and how to maintain it.

Button drove in the British Formula 3 International Series in 1999 in a slightly underpowered Renault-Dallara F399 car compared to the Mugen-Honda engine, with guidance from trainer-physiotherapist Josef Leberer. Amongst more experienced racers, he won three times—at Thruxton, Pembrey and Silverstone—to finish the season as the top rookie driver, and third overall. He finished fifth and second respectively in the Marlboro Masters and Macau Grand Prix, losing out by 0.035 seconds to Darren Manning in Macau. Button was required to decide on his future post-season. He did not want another year in F3 and twice tested a higher-tier Formula 3000 (F3000) car with both the Super Nova Racing and Fortec Motorsport teams at the Jerez circuit in Spain, which he disliked because its sequential gearbox forced him to drive aggressively, and found the cars somewhat heavy.

Formula One career

Williams (2000)

In November 1999, Button had his McLaren test prize at the Silverstone club circuit in a MP4/13 car and impressed team owner Ron Dennis. He also tested for the Prost team at the Circuit de Catalunya after the team owner Alain Prost was impressed by Button's ability and asked him to test. Prost offered Button a drive at his F3000 squad before becoming his F1 team's test driver for one season to prepare for competitive driving. He did not commit because Prost had not prepared to fulfill the promise of a F1 seat. Huysman and Robertson declined Dennis' offer for Button to join the McLaren team and a seat from Jaguar chairman Jackie Stewart.

A vacant race seat became available at the Williams team, following the departure of two-time CART champion Alessandro Zanardi.  Other contenders for the seat included sports car driver Jörg Müller and Japanese Formula Three champion Darren Manning. On 24 December 1999, team founder and principal Frank Williams telephoned Button, who first thought it a joke, and asked whether he was ready to drive in F1 to which he said no. Button's father instructed him to tell Williams he was indeed ready. Button talked with Williams and BMW motorsport director Gerhard Berger and a 'shoot-out' test was arranged between Button and F3000 racer and test driver Bruno Junqueira at Jerez in a Williams FW21B car modified by being fitted with an BMW engine. with Button securing the drive, even though the majority of the team's engineers preferred Junqueira. This made him Britain's youngest ever F1 driver, beating the previous record held by Stirling Moss. Button did not hold a FIA Super Licence and the FIA president Max Mosley required him to complete  on two consecutive days of testing and support from 18 of the 26 members of the F1 Commission. The FIA chose to issue him with a super licence regardless. Button worked with a physiotherapist to help build his strength to drive an F1 car.

A sixth-place finish at the season's second race in Brazil made him the youngest driver in history to score a point. In his first six races, he qualified higher than his teammate Ralf Schumacher twice, and was consistently close in pace. However, Williams had intended to use Button only until they could exercise their option to buy the highly rated Juan Pablo Montoya out of his contract at Chip Ganassi Racing. A dip in Button's form, combined with Montoya's victory in the 2000 Indianapolis 500, led to Montoya being announced as his replacement midway through the season. Williams chose not to sell Button's contract, keeping the right to recall him in 2003. He went to Benetton Formula on a two-year loan.

Under safety car conditions Button swerved to avoid the pack which had bunched up, and crashed into a barrier. Button finished his debut season in eighth place with 12 points.

Enstone based teams (2001–2002)

Benetton (2001)

For , Button partnered experienced driver Giancarlo Fisichella at Benetton, which had recently been purchased by Renault. His car was very uncompetitive due to a lack of power steering and horsepower to the faster teams coupled with a lack of pre-season testing and he was consistently outperformed by his teammate. His poor form led to speculation he would be replaced before the end of the year; team principal Flavio Briatore said, "Either he shows he's super-good or he leaves the top echelon of drivers", and reportedly offered him the chance to leave. Briatore believed Button's inexperience showed as he struggled to help his team set up a competitive car. His lack of success combined with an extravagant lifestyle led some press publications to dub him a "playboy".

Renault (2002)

In , Benetton was re-branded as Renault, and Jarno Trulli joined the team to partner Button. In a bid to improve his public image over the pre-season interval, he changed his social life habits, spending more time training, and separating from Robertson and Huysman to join John Byfield's sport managerial stable after Briatore talked to Button about Byfield. In late 2001, Briatore invited Button to spend ten days at a ranch in Kenya, to become acquainted with his peers and do physical training to eliminate a shoulder and back problem that had hindered him in 2001. Button spent a lot of time working with his engineering team and felt there was an improved understanding between them; Button described himself as "very confident" for the season.

At the season's second race in Malaysia, he was set for his first podium before a rear suspension problem on the final lap dropped him to fourth place. Button's performances were greatly improved from 2001 because his car had power steering and launch control; although often outqualified by Trulli, he showed the faster race pace to outscore his more experienced teammate. Despite Button's performances, and his desire to stay with Renault, he was told by Briatore by telephone that test driver Fernando Alonso would replace him in 2003. Briatore faced criticism for his decision, but stated "time will tell if I am wrong"; he would also accuse Button of being a "lazy playboy". In July, Button signed a two-year contract with a two-year option for British American Racing (BAR) with the option for a further two years after that to replace the outgoing Olivier Panis, partnering 1997 world champion Jacques Villeneuve, after discussions with several teams fell through. An important factor in his decision was the chance to work with David Richards, the BAR team principal, and he was impressed with the team's long-term programme. He finished the season seventh with 14 points.

Brackley based teams (2003–2009)

BAR (2003–2005)

2003 
Button faced early hostility from new teammate Villeneuve, who said Button "should be in a boy band" and was not on speaking terms with him. Their relationship did not improve after the first race in Australia: Villeneuve was due to pit, but stayed out an extra lap and made a pit stop when Button was due in, leaving Button waiting in the pit lane while Villeneuve's car was serviced. Villeneuve blamed it on "radio problems", but both Button and Richards hinted that they did not believe him. His relationship with Villeneuve improved thereafter because of his better performance and said the comments were caused by inter-team changes. A high speed crash for Button during Saturday qualifying in Monaco briefly knocked him unconscious, and he was detained in hospital overnight. Despite the accident Button still wanted to race, but was withdrawn by his team on medical advice. He was cleared to race for the following Grand Prix in Montreal. Button continued to outperform his teammate and this helped rebuild his previously faltering reputation. Just before the final race in Japan, Villeneuve lost his seat at BAR, so Button was partnered with Takuma Sato; he took his second fourth place of the season, and finished ninth in the Drivers' Championship with 17 points.

2004 
The  season was the first in which Button was the more experienced driver in his team. He was ambitious for the season, saying he wanted to challenge consistently for points and podium finishes. He followed it up two weeks later with another third-place in Bahrain. In the next race at Imola, he took his first pole position and finished second behind Michael Schumacher. He took 10 podiums in 18 races, and scored no points in three. Button came third in the Drivers' Championship and helped BAR to take second in the Constructors' Championship.

In August, Button became embroiled in a contract dispute. On 5 August, Button chose to leave BAR and signed a two-year contract to return to Williams. He did so because BAR were not a works manufacturer team but Williams were in a partnership with BMW and felt they could help him win the Drivers' Championship. This was surprising, as Button was enjoying his best season to date, while Williams had been struggling. BAR insisted they had the right to exercise their option to retain Button. His management argued that the BAR option was not valid because it contained a clause allowing him to leave if BAR risked losing their Honda engines. They felt the new contract signed mid-year for Honda to supply engines to BAR was not definitive, and thus Button was free to move. The dispute went to F1's Contract Recognition Board, who ruled in favour of BAR on 20 October, forcing Button to stay with the team. Button separated from his manager John Byfield as a result, saying he had been badly advised. He asked his friend Richard Goodard to manage him, and employed a personal assistant in restructuring his organisation.

2005 

Despite the feud, Button insisted he had BAR's backing, and was optimistic for the  season. He was unable to deal with regulation changes concerning aerodynamics and his car lacked pace as a result. Button was disqualified from third place at the  after race scrutineers found his car had a second fuel tank inside the main one, that when drained, made his car underweight. The FIA International Court of Appeal banned Button and his team from the next two races as a result. Following his return, he took the second pole position of his career in Montreal, but crashed out after an error while running third.

For the second year in a row, Button had contract disputes involving BAR and Williams. Frank Williams insisted the contract was fully binding, and that there would be "absolutely no turning back"; his team required Button to fulfill some contractual obligations with sponsors. After several weeks of talks, Williams agreed to release Button in exchange for an estimated £18 million in compensation.

Honda (2006–2008)

2006 

BAR was renamed Honda prior to 2006 following a buyout by the Japanese manufacturer and Button was partnered by the experienced Rubens Barrichello. Honda granted Button equal status and he would receive no preferential treatment alongside Barrichello. The new team performed well in testing, helped by the extra resources now available from Honda, and Button was confident in the car. He had been frustrated by not converting his increasing experience and confidence in his driving into success in 2005 and was excited about Honda's car and engine development enabling race victory challenges. The first win of his career was at a rain-affected  from a 14th position start – the 113th Grand Prix start of his career. Button finished fourth or fifth at each of the next five races and ended the season with a podium finish at the final round in Brazil. Over the last six races of the season, he scored more points (35) than any other driver.

2007 

In , Button again drove with Honda alongside Barrichello. He was unable to partake in pre-season testing because of two hairline fractures to his ribs, sustained in a karting incident in late 2006. His Honda RA107 car had an aerodynamic imbalance from lacking grip after Shuhei Nakamoto was appointed Senior Technical Director following the departure of Geoff Willis. His year was worse than in 2006, driving within the middle of the field and usually qualifying outside of the top ten. He scored six points over the course of the season for 15th overall with a best finish of fifth at the rain-affected .

2008 

He and a group of friends went to Lanzarote to establish a base to train for the upcoming season. Button was confident since the technical director Ross Brawn became Honda's team principal and noticed wind tunnel designs of the car. Button began working with human performance coach Michael Collier that year.

On the morning of 4 December 2008, the global economic crisis caused Honda to withdraw from F1, leaving Button's chances of a drive in  dependent on the team finding a buyer. He was informed of the news by Goodard the day before and Button changed his plans to discuss the withdrawal with colleagues and not the performance of his 2009 car. He declined an offer to drive for Red Bull Racing's junior team Toro Rosso because they would not give him a podium-winning car and they wanted sponsorship funding.

Brawn GP (2009)
Brawn purchased the Honda team for a nominal fee and renamed it as Brawn GP in early March 2009. Although he was installed by bookmakers as a 100–1 outsider for the championship, Button's Brawn BGP 001 car was quick and reliable in pre-season testing in Europe due to an efficient aerodynamic package, a powerful Mercedes-Benz V8 engine and grippy slick tyres. The car's seat was lowered to make him comfortable.

Button won six of the first seven races with four pole positions, having benefited from a double diffuser design making him and the Toyota and Williams teams faster than others. Once the major teams had introduced their own reconfigured diffusers Button's dominance ended, averaging sixth position in the following ten races and scoring 35 points after accumulating 61 in the first seven. This was due to the team spending 10 per cent of its allocated £7 million budget on developing the car and Button's smooth driving style preventing him from generating heat into its tyres in cold weather. His championship campaign was boosted by Vettel qualifying 16th, but team-mate and closest rival Barrichello qualified on pole. In the race, Button finished fifth, taking enough points to secure the championship with one round remaining.

In the off-season, Brawn and team principal Nick Fry informed Button they wanted him to sign an extension to his contract and be paired with Nico Rosberg. Button asked for a commitment to car development for 2010 and a close to a repeat performance of the 2009 season. Brawn and Fry said Mercedes would buy-out Brawn GP without locating potential sponsors, which Button found unappealing and told his manager Richard Goodard he desired a new challenge.

McLaren (2010–2017)

Goodard telephoned McLaren team principal Martin Whitmarsh to enquire about a drive for Button. Whitmarsh did not believe Button would leave Brawn GP since they had won the Championship; Goodard mentioned McLaren's competitiveness at the end of 2009 and partnering 2008 world champion Lewis Hamilton appealed to Button. Discussions took place at the team's headquarters in Woking and a three-year deal was signed soon after. Button said he moved because he wanted the motivation and challenge from competing alongside Hamilton, but Whitmarsh cautioned the two before the start of the season he would observe any relationship problems between them.

2010

He later finished second in Turkey after a miscommunication with his team caused him to battle Hamilton for the victory. This cooled his relationship with Hamilton who believed McLaren favoured Button. He followed with two podium finishes and a trio of points scoring finishes to remain in contention for the championship. Button retired at the  after Vettel hit him and punctured the radiator of his car. Second at Monza was followed by a fourth place in both Singapore and Japan. During the  weekend, Button and his entourage were threatened by a number of criminals in the favelas on his way back from qualifying at Interlagos; nobody was harmed during the incident. Button was mathematically eliminated from retaining the title with a fifth place in the race and took fifth in the championship with third in Abu Dhabi.

2011

He believed the introduction of Pirelli tyres that season would suit his smooth driving style and said a world championship victory would make it difficult for him to retire from F1. Button began the season by finishing no lower than sixth in the first six races with three podium results. He won the rain-affected  after two collisions dropped him to the back of the field and overtaking Vettel when the latter ran wide on the slippery track on the final lap. Button took 3 victories and 12 podium finishes to finish runner-up with 270 points.

2012

Whitmarsh wanted Button to remain at McLaren for the next three years while the latter held talks with Ferrari about a race seat in 2013. Before the 2011 Japanese Grand Prix, he signed a three-year extension to his contract with McLaren. Button was satisfied with the new MP4-27 car due to McLaren finding a regulation loophole banning the blowing of exhaust gases over parts of the vehicle to improve downforce. His overall performance in the first seven races fell due to difficulty in generating temperature and the correct amount of grip into the new Pirelli short-life front tyres due to his smooth driving style and him switching brake materials multiple times to try and fix the issue made it worse. Button changed the set-up of his car and adapted himself to the tyres to retain temperature for better performance. The rest of Button's season saw him achieve wins in Belgium and Brazil and top-five finishes in five of the next seven rounds for fifth overall with 188 points.

2013

He was appointed a director of the Grand Prix Drivers' Association (GPDA) in March 2013. This caused Button to drive an unstable car with understeer, a lack of downforce and severe tyre degradation. After finishing ninth at the season-opening , McLaren introduced components from the MP4-27 onto the MP4-28, which had no significant effect and Button continued to attain sub-par results throughout the season with a best of fourth at the season-ending . He was ninth overall with 73 points. Button was involved in aggressive driving from his teammate Pérez early in the season in Bahrain and Monaco, annoying him.

2014–2015

He activated the terms of his contract to stay with McLaren for 2014 in September 2013, but considered taking a sabbatical from F1 following the unexpected death of his father in Monaco in January 2014. Button was joined by Kevin Magnussen, with whom he was able to build a rapport, and the MP4-29 car had an understeer from lacking front downforce and an unstable rear. He finished third at the season-opening  after Red Bull Racing driver Daniel Ricciardo was disqualified for a fuel flow consumption infringement and his team lost a subsequent appeal against the decision. It would turn out to be his final career podium. Button achieved a quartet of fourth-place finishes and scored points seven more times for eighth in the Drivers' Championship and 126 points. Button qualified better than Magnussen ten times and scored twice as many points.

He wanted to remain at McLaren but was made insecure about his career and told himself to concentrate on the present and not be concerned about the future. Dennis did not want Button to drive for McLaren but fellow team shareholder Mansour Ojjeh told him Button should remain over Magnussen after reviewing the situation. Negotiations between Button and McLaren racing director Éric Boullier and team owner Ron Dennis concluded with an agreement for Button to continue racing on 10 December. Button agreed to take a pay cut, with his contract containing the option for a second year; McLaren or Button were able to activate clauses to break the contract after the season if one of the parties desired it. He was rarely able to progress past the first qualifying session and took 16th in the Drivers' Championship with 16 points.

2016–2017

He was retained by the McLaren team for  following contractual discussions with Dennis and meetings with aerodynamics and engineers at the McLaren Technology Centre (MTC). Button received a 50 per cent pay rise by staying at McLaren for another year. He had considered returning to the Williams team but decided against it. His car's new Honda engine was more powerful and allowed him to challenge for points-scoring finishes but reliability continued to hinder him and McLaren. Button went on to finish the race a season-high sixth. He was unable to finish higher than eighth thereafter and ended his full-time career with a suspension failure at the season-ending . Button took 15th in the Drivers' Championship with 21 points finishing better than Alonso five times and qualifying higher on four occasions.

Dennis asked Button to wait before returning for discussion to which he said he had already decided. He suggested Button take a sabbatical and mull over the decision to retire while resting and made Button an ambassador for McLaren. He would work in the team's simulator at MTC, represent them at sponsor functions and attempt to help them in car development. Button was retained by McLaren as reserve driver with the option to return to full-time racing for the team in  if he and McLaren agreed to it. He was replaced as a GPDA director by Romain Grosjean. He prepared in the team's simulator instead of testing in Bahrain because he would learn nothing by not driving on a narrow street circuit. He retired late in the race following a collision with Sauber driver Pascal Wehrlein that damaged his car.

In November 2017, Button was replaced as McLaren reserve driver by 2017 FIA Formula Three European champion Lando Norris for 2018. His contract with McLaren expired without renewal at the end of 2017 allowing him to focus on other racing ventures.

Williams senior advisor (2021) 
In January 2021, Button rejoined Williams as a senior advisor on a multi-year deal. He will work with their race and Williams Academy drivers on-track and at the team's headquarters and conduct ambassadorial duties for the team. Button focuses on the entire team and not one specific department but could not enter Williams' premises due to travel restrictions from the United States, and COVID-19 protocols restricted his mixing with team since he was in the Sky Sports broadcasting bubble.

Super GT career

Button became interested in Super GT in about 2011, and discussions with Honda led to his series debut at the 2017 Suzuka 1000km in a NSX-GT for Team Mugen with teammates Hideki Mutoh and Daisuke Nakajima. The trio finished 12th following two penalties and two tyre punctures. He also considered racing as a third driver for Acura Team Penske's IMSA SportsCar Championship team, but was rejected. Button drove the full 2018 Super GT Series for Team Kunimitsu in the No. 100 GT500-class Honda NSX-GT alongside Naoki Yamamoto; Button wanted to drive a Bridgestone-shod car and drivers recommended Yamamoto because he speaks English. Button's team helped him to communicate better, adapt to the series and its culture. He and Yamamoto won at Sportsland Sugo and took two-second-place finishes to enter the season-ending race at Twin Ring Motegi equal on points with the TOM'S duo of Ryō Hirakawa and Nick Cassidy. He held off Hirakawa to win the GT500 title by three points and was the first rookie champion since Toranosuke Takagi in 2005.

For the 2019 season, Button remained at Team Kunimitsu alongside Yamamoto in the renumbered No. 1 Honda. In an incident-filled season, Button and Yamamoto were taken out of the lead in the opening round at Okayama, a mistimed safety car at the second Fuji race and a poor tyre choice in the rain at Sugo cost the team possible victories. The pair achieved two podium finishes at both Fuji rounds and a sixth place at Motegi to finish eighth in the GT500 Drivers' Championship with 37 points. In October 2019, he drove the final two races of the season-ending Deutsche Tourenwagen Masters (DTM) round at the Hockenheimring in his Team Kunimitsu NSX car as Honda's wild card entry. He finished 9th in the first race and 16th in the second. Button did not enter the "Super GT × DTM Dream Race" at Fuji Speedway because his contract did not oblige him to do so, and left Super GT after 2019 because he did not want to fly frequently from the United States to Japan and wanted to explore other racing series.

Sports car career
Button made his endurance racing debut at the 1999 24 Hours of Spa, sharing a BMW Team Raffanelli 320i E46 with David Saelens and Tomáš Enge in the SP class, and retiring after 22 laps with fuel tank failure. Button agreed to drive most of the 2018–19 FIA World Endurance Championship sharing a BR Engineering BR1 car in the Le Mans Prototype 1 (LMP1) class with Vitaly Petrov and Mikhail Aleshin for SMP Racing. Making his FIA World Endurance Championship debut at the 2018 24 Hours of Le Mans, electronic problems dropped the car down the order before the team retired with an engine failure late in the race with Button driving at the time. He finished fourth at the 6 Hours of Fuji and third at the following 6 Hours of Shanghai. Button missed the 1000 Miles of Sebring and 6 Hours of Spa-Francorchamps because of Super GT commitments, and the 2019 24 Hours of Le Mans because his fiancée was due to give birth to their first child.

He made his British GT debut in the 2020 season's final round, the three-hour Silverstone 500, sharing the No. 3 Jenson Team Rocket RJN McLaren 720S GT3 with team co-owner Chris Buncombe. The two finished the race in 14th position. Button is due to drive Hendrick Motorsports's NASCAR Next Gen Chevrolet Camaro ZL1 Garage 56 entry alongside sports car driver Mike Rockenfeller and NASCAR racer Jimmie Johnson at the 2023 24 Hours of Le Mans.

Other racing ventures 
Button was invited to the Race of Champions six times: in 2007, 2008, 2009, 2011, 2015 and 2017, reaching the semi-finals of the Nations Cup with Andy Priaulx for Team Autosport in 2007 and 2008 and finishing second in 2009. His best performance in the Race of Champions were the semi-finals in 2009. In 2019, Button drove off-road races in a Rocket Motorsports-entered Brenthel Industries Spec 6100 TT class truck with Buncombe and managing director Mazen Fawaz his co-drivers. This came about when Button told Buncombe they would race the Baja 1000 as Buncombe's 40th birthday present and sought vehicle components. Navigated by Terry Madden, he finished no higher than the top 20 in the Mint 400 with retirements in the Vegas to Reno and the Baja 1000. 

In 2020, while motor racing was suspended due to the COVID-19 pandemic, Button participated in eSports races.  In January 2021, Button launched JBXE to compete in the all-electric SUV off-road racing series Extreme E from the 2021 season on. Button made his first foray into historic racing at the 2021 Goodwood Revival, partaking in the Stirling Moss Trophy and the Royal Automobile Club TT Celebration races. He is set to drive an FC1-X car for the Xite Energy Racing team in the all-electric Group E category for the 2022–23 season of the off-road Nitro Rallycross series.

Button will run three NASCAR Cup Series races in 2023 for Rick Ware Racing in the No. 15 car, starting with the Texas Grand Prix at Circuit of the Americas.

Driving style

Button has a smooth driving style; journalist Mark Hughes wrote in 2009, "Button has a fantastic feel for how much momentum can be taken into a corner and this allows him to be minimal in his inputs—his steering and throttle movements in particular tend to be graceful and beautifully co-ordinated." This allows him to perform well in wet-weather where the front of the car tends to slide more than the rear, and many believe his smooth style better preserves the tyres during a race. He adapted his style in go-karts and transferred it to more powerful machinery. Since 2000, Button has braked with his left foot, by dragging the brake pedal and stopping the car in less time to control and modulate power. He likes to turn into a corner early under braking and balance the car on pedal application and steering, creating more strain in tyre loads for a longer physical lap but allowing for a higher minimum corner entry speed and allowing Button to adapt to a changeable or slippery track.

He is comfortable driving a car with understeer, prefers the rear to be stable into corners and on which he is able to lean on leaving them, and rarely locks the inside of his front tyres. His smooth driving also means he cannot generate the necessary tyre temperature on a cool track. Button occasionally cannot get his tyres to operate efficiently over a single lap in qualifying because his gentle steering produces less energy into the wheel. His driving gave him additional thought time and be less prone to making an error for improved consistency in races and notices events without the team necessarily instructing him on what to do. Button accurately exploits grip on a damp corner to adapt to his limits earlier than other drivers. During 2001 and 2007, when traction control was legal in F1, he was able to control the throttle pedal to prevent wheelspin, allowing him to be as fast due to his feel for grip exiting a turn.

Driver number
For the 2014 season, the FIA created a new sporting regulation allowing a driver to select a unique car number for use throughout their F1 career. Button chose the number 22, which was the one he was assigned in his 2009 championship season.

Endorsements and philanthropy 
The BBC signed Button to promote its BBCi digital television interactive service from December 2003 to January 2004. He is a brand ambassador for Head & Shoulders, and appeared in advertising campaigns for the company. Other companies that Button has done business with are Hilton, Hugo Boss, Santander Bank, Tag Heuer, Vodafone. and Baylis & Harding. As a result of Button's endorsement money and Mercedes salary, he was listed as one of the world's top-earning drivers in motorsports by Forbes between June 2012 and June 2013. He and multi-sport brand Dare 2b collaborated on a men's ski range of clothing and accessories called AW20 in 2020. Button worked with car builder Ant Anstead, designer Mark Stubbs and business adviser Roger Behle to relaunch luxury coach maker Radford in early 2021.

Button is also involved in charitable work through the creation of The Jenson Button Trust. Established in March 2010, the Trust selects and nominates a number of charitable beneficiaries that receive funding. He is a patron of Make-A-Wish Foundation UK granting the wishes of terminally ill children and young persons, a sport ambassador for both The Prince's Trust and the Princess Charlene of Monaco Foundation, and supports the Sean Edwards Foundation. Button is part of Johnnie Walker's Join The Pact initiative to promote responsible drinking, and began the Pink for Papa campaign in 2014 following the death of his father to raise funding for the Henry Surtees Foundation.

Button ran a restaurant, Victus, in Harrogate from 2011 to 2012. In 2012, he, Goodard and public relations officer James Williamson founded sports agency The Sports Partnership to provide public relations services and management to the sporting industry. Button, Buncombe and team principal Bob Neville founded sports car team Jenson Team Rocket RJN in late 2018.

Public image
Button has received a varying amount of press coverage from minor to extensive on his F1 career and personal life; this effect has been labelled "Buttonmania". Prior to winning the 2009 championship, his lack of success led critics to label him "a nearly man" and "a pin-up and lightweight" for his photogenic appearance, but it ceased following his success. Ben Anderson of Autosport notes that the driver "is rarely picked as one of grand prix racing's true elite drivers" and is not "discussed in the same breath as those, such as Schumacher and Ayrton Senna" due to "a lack of absolute dynamism behind the wheel in difficult technical circumstances – perhaps holds him back from being regarded as among the true elite." Writing for The New York Times, Brad Spurgeon said that Button's F1 debut began a trend of teams signing young drivers and how they would cope with pressure, performance and the media in the championship. BBC Sport's Andrew Benson called him "urbane and eloquent. Good-looking and charismatic, he is a marketing person's dream, and has a ready wit that can edge into sarcasm if he is impatient or uncomfortable with a situation."

Button finished second to footballer Ryan Giggs in voting for the 2009 BBC Sports Personality of the Year Award. He also won the BBC West Country's Sports Personality of the Year and the Laureus World Breakthrough of the Year award. He won the 2000 BBC Sports Personality of the Year Newcomer Award for finishing eighth in that year's F1 season, the Lorenzo Bandini Trophy in 2001, and the Hawthorn Memorial Trophy as the most successful British or Commonwealth driver in a season five times: from 2004 to 2006, 2009 and 2011. Button was voted the Autosport Rookie of the Year in 2000, the International Racing Driver Award in 2004 and 2009, and the British Competition Driver of the Year in 2003, 2009, 2011 and 2012. He won the BRDC Gold Star in 2004 and 2009, and was inducted into the FIA Hall of Fame in 2017.

He was appointed Member of the Order of the British Empire (MBE) in the 2010 New Year Honours for services to motorsport. Button's home town, Frome, has named a street and a footbridge carrying the River Frome after him, and has awarded him the freedom of the town. Button received an honorary doctorate in engineering from the University of Bath in December 2016. He has authored five books about his life and career.

Personal life
His hobbies include mountain biking, competing in triathlons and bodyboarding. He also maintains an automobile collection. He was engaged to the English actress and singer Louise Griffiths before ending their five-year relationship in 2005. Button was married to his long-time Japanese girlfriend and model Jessica Michibata from 2014 to 2015. He married American model Brittny Ward in 2022 with whom he has a son and a daughter. They currently reside in Los Angeles. Button supports Bristol City Football Club.

On 3 August 2015, Button and his then wife Jessica were burgled at a rented Saint-Tropez home while staying with friends when robbers looted the house and stole belongings worth £300,000 including his wife's £250,000 engagement ring. Reports suggested that the couple might have been gassed through the air conditioning system prior to the burglars' entry into the building.

Racing record

Career summary

† As Button was a guest driver, he was ineligible to score championship points.

Complete Spa 24 Hours results

Complete Formula One results
(key) (Races in bold indicate pole position; races in italics indicate fastest lap; small number denotes the finishing position)

 Half points awarded as less than 75% of race distance was completed.
 Button did not finish the Grand Prix, but was classified as he completed over 90% of the race distance.

Complete Super GT results
(key) (Races in bold indicate pole position; races in italics indicate fastest lap; small number denotes the finishing position)

24 Hours of Le Mans results

Complete FIA World Endurance Championship results
(key) (Races in bold indicate pole position; races in italics indicate fastest lap; small number denotes the finishing position)

Complete British GT Championship results
(key) (Races in bold indicate pole position) (Races in italics indicate fastest lap)

† Not eligible for points.

Complete Extreme E results
(key)

NASCAR
(key) (Bold – Pole position awarded by qualifying time. Italics – Pole position earned by points standings or practice time. * – Most laps led.)

Cup Series

Bibliography

Notes

References

External links

 
 
 

1980 births
Living people
21st-century English memoirists
24 Hours of Le Mans drivers
24 Hours of Spa drivers
BAR Formula One drivers
Benetton Formula One drivers
Brawn Formula One drivers
BRDC Gold Star winners
English autobiographers
British Formula Three Championship drivers
English expatriates in Monaco
English expatriates in the United States
English Formula One drivers
English racing drivers
English male triathletes
Formula Ford drivers
Formula One race winners
Formula One World Drivers' Champions
Honda Formula One drivers
Karting World Championship drivers
Laureus World Sports Awards winners
McLaren Formula One drivers
Members of the Order of the British Empire
People from Frome
Renault Formula One drivers
Sportspeople from Somerset
Williams Formula One drivers
British GT Championship drivers
Haywood Racing drivers
OAK Racing drivers
Team Kunimitsu drivers
SMP Racing drivers
Extreme E drivers
Sports car racing team owners
Deutsche Tourenwagen Masters drivers
Mugen Motorsports drivers
English people of South African descent